Muravey is a rural locality (a village) in Kazadayevsky Selsoviet, Sterlitamaksky District, Bashkortostan, Russia. The population was 218 as of 2010. There are 5 streets.

Geography 
Muravey is located 14 km northwest of Sterlitamak (the district's administrative centre) by road. Novoye Baryatino is the nearest rural locality.

References 

Rural localities in Sterlitamaksky District